Zaplana is a small village in the hills west of Vrhnika in the Inner Carniola region of Slovenia.

History
The settlements of Jamnik, Jerinov Grič, Marinčev Grič, Mizni Dol, Prezid, Strmica, and Trčkov Grič were all administratively separated from Zaplana in 2002 and given the status of independent villages.

Church

The parish church in the settlement is dedicated to Saint Ulrich and belongs to the Ljubljana Archdiocese. The church was renovated in a pseudo-Romanesque style after fire and earthquake damage in 1895.

Notable people
 Janez Drnovšek (1950–2008), second president of Slovenia

References

External links
Zaplana on Geopedia

Populated places in the Municipality of Vrhnika